Kollywood may refer to:
 Tamil cinema, production of motion pictures in the Tamil language
 Kurukh cinema, production of motion pictures in the Kurukh language
 Cinema of Nepal, nickname for production of motion pictures in Kathmandu, Nepal in Nepali language